Petar Todorov Gudev (13 July 1863, Gradets – 8 May 1932, Sofia) was a leading Bulgarian liberal politician, who served as Prime Minister.

Gudev was appointed Prime Minister following the assassination of his predecessor Dimitar Petkov (with Dimitar Stanchov serving a few days as interim). His reign proved fairly brief, running from 16 March 1907 until 28 January 1908, and during this time he became notorious for corruption, plundering public funds for his own use.

References

 

1863 births
1940 deaths
Chairpersons of the National Assembly of Bulgaria
People from Kotel, Bulgaria
People's Liberal Party politicians
Prime Ministers of Bulgaria